Richard Barker may refer to:

Politicians
 Richard Barker (MP) (c. 1554–1636), English politician
 Rick Barker (born 1951), New Zealand politician

Sports
 Richie Barker (footballer, born 1975), English football manager
 Richie Barker (footballer, born 1939) (1939–2020), English footballer, assistant manager and scout
 Richie Barker (baseball) (born 1972), Major League Baseball pitcher
 Richard Barker (tennis) (born 1981), British professional tennis player
 Richard Barker (footballer) (1869–1940), English football player
 Dick Barker (1897–1964), American football coach in the United States

Others
 Richard Barker Octagon House, historic house in Worcester, Massachusetts
 Richard Barker (healthcare consultant) (born 1948), British health expert
 Richard Barker (stage manager) (1834–1903), British comedian, stage manager and stage director

See also
 Richard Raymond-Barker (1894–1918), World War I flying ace